The Fiat Argenta is a large family car produced by the Italian automobile company Fiat from 1981 to 1985. It was a comprehensive update of the Fiat 132 and the last mass-produced Fiat with rear-wheel drive until the 2016 124 Spider. The change to a name came about as Fiat was changing their naming strategy, changing from three-digit numbers to more meaningful names. This model was available in sedan/saloon bodystyle only.

Argenta (1981-1983)

Arriving in May 1981, the Argenta was closely based on its predecessor Fiat 132. Although all body panels and windows except the doors were new only a careful observer would have noticed (also the 132 door handles were used again, but on the opposite sides, so on the Argenta they were positioned 'backwards'). The most marked change was to the front clip, with large rectangular headlamps replacing the earlier twin round units. Bigger, square rubber bumpers made the car about  longer. The fuel tank was moved from a somewhat exposed location at the rear right and was now mounted upright behind the rear seat. This also required relocating the fuel tank filler from the fender up to the C-pillar.

Other changes included new trim, wheels, dashboard, mirrors, rectangular headlights, and a refined suspension and brakes. Trim level was raised compared to the previous 132 and the contemporary 131 Mirafiori, with power steering, electric windows, and door locking. Much was also made of the new Check Panel, a diagnostic panel with a diagram of the car which would light up if any safety-related function needed attention. Some markets had a large manually-sliding steel sunroof, others had the option of air conditioning.

The Argenta came with a choice of four different engines, of which one was a diesel. The diesel option has a noticeable hump on the bonnet to clear the larger engine. Not all engines were available in all of the Argenta's markets:

Argenta 1600
1.6 litre petrol producing 
Argenta 2000 (the one engine available in the United Kingdom at the time of introduction)
2.0 litre petrol with 
Argenta 2000 i.e., 2000 Injection
2.0 litre petrol with Bosch L-jetronic fuel injection producing 
Argenta 2500 D
2.5 litre diesel with 

Marelli Digiplex electronic ignition was fitted to the 2000 i.e.

Facelift (1983-1985)

In June 1983, the Argenta was facelifted. The grille was renewed with the then corporate five-bar grille, new front end, slimmer new bumpers, and with an anti-roll-bar mounted on the rear axle. Some minor changes were made inside the car, most notably to the seat/door/roof lining trim and a new steering wheel. The radio antenna moved from inside the windscreen to the roof. The carburetted two-liter model (Argenta 110) was only sold outside of Italy and was added to the lineup in March 1984.

The Argenta had also two new engines: Fiat's first turbodiesel, a 2.45 litre four producing  arrived as part of the facelift. In March 1984 the Argenta VX arrived, with a supercharged 2.0-liter engine with  shared with the Lancia Volumex models. Both these models had rear disc brakes and a 70-litre fuel tank instead of the usual 60 litres. The VX was only sold abroad; the Italian-market model was called the SX and went on sale in June 1984.

The new versions were named:
Argenta 100 
Argenta 110
Argenta 120 i.e.
Argenta VX (SX on the Italian market)
Argenta Diesel
Argenta Turbo D

The car remained in production until 1985 when it was replaced by the Croma.

References

Argenta
1980s cars
Cars introduced in 1981
Rear-wheel-drive vehicles
Sedans
Cars discontinued in 1985